Lim Beng Hong (1898 — 3 February 1979) OBE, who preferred to be, and was most often, referred to as Mrs. B. H. Oon, was the first woman to be called to the Malayan Bar 1927. She was also the first ethically Chinese woman to hold a degree from University College London, the first Malayan woman to be called to the English Bar (1926), and the first woman representative on the Federation of Malaya Legislative Council (1948).  According to press reports at the time, Lim Beng Hong and her brother Lim Khye Seng made English legal history when, in 1926, they became the first brother and sister to be called to the bar on the same night.  History was made again when they were both called to the bar in Penang, on the same day.

Early life and education 
Oon was born in Butterworth, Penang in 1903 during British Malaya. She reportedly came from a wealthy family as her father was a merchant. After finishing her education at the Government's Girls' School in Penang, she returned to the school and taught there for 3 years. After that, she decided to go to England with her brother to get a law degree.

After receiving her law degree from University College London, Oon and her brother applied to the Bar and they both got admitted to the Inner Temple. The two siblings were then called to the English Bar on the very same night in June 1926.

Admission to the Malayan Bar 
She returned to Penang in 1927 to get married. However, marriage did not stop her from applying to join the Bar of the Straits Settlements and the Federated Malay States. At that time in British Malaya, women were prohibited from joining the Bar, so the law was changed in 1927 for Oon to be admitted. Hence, she became the first woman to be admitted to the Malayan Bar. However, the legality of this amendment was not confirmed until 1935 by the Chief Justice of the Kuala Lumpur Supreme Court.

Notable work and achievements

Smuggling letters during the war 
After returning to Penang from England in 1927, she joined the law firm Lim & Lim Advocates and Solicitors. When the war broke out in 1948 and the Japanese invaded Malaya, Oon fled and went to live in Singapore. However, Singapore soon fell into Japanese occupation as well, but sing the Asian population was allowed freedom, Oon decided to utilize that freedom and smuggle and deliver letters to prisoners of war that were held captive in Changi prison.

First woman lawmaker of Malaya 
After the war, Oon became the first woman in Parliament in Malaya. She was appointed as one of the two women representatives of the Federal Legislative Council and she remained part of the council from 1948 to1955.

Politics 
After 1955, Oon got involved with politics. She joined the Labour Party in her hometown as a councillor. She was also the creator of the "Woman's Charter" which was included in the Pan-Malayan Labour Party manifesto.

OBE Award 
In 1953, Oon received the Most Excellent Order of the British Empire Award for her services. This is a very prestigious award that citizens in Commonwealth countries received before they gained independence. It was awarded to Oon as a recognition of the contributions she has made for the betterment of society in British Malaya.

President of the International Federation of Women Lawyers (FIDA) 
Oon was elected as the President of the International Federation of Women Lawyers in 1977.

See also 
 First women lawyers around the world

References 

1948 in Malaya
Federation of Malaya
People of British Penang
British Malaya lawyers
People from Penang
Malaysian people of Chinese descent
20th-century Malaysian women politicians
20th-century Malaysian lawyers
20th-century Malaysian politicians
1898 births
1979 deaths
Date of birth unknown
Malaysian women lawyers